The Ferrari Monza SP1 and SP2 are limited production sports cars produced by Italian automobile manufacturer Ferrari, introduced in 2018 for the 2019 model year. The cars mark the start of a new lineage of models called the "Icona" series, a program aimed at creating special cars inspired by classic Ferrari models, all to be produced in limited series. The first cars of the new lineage are the Monza SP1 and SP2, whose designs are inspired by the 750 Monza, 250 Testarossa and 166 MM. The SP1 and SP2 nomenclature refers to the number of seats for each model. 499 units are expected to be produced at a price of €1.58 million before options.

Specifications

Engine 
Both the SP1 and SP2 are powered by a variant of the naturally aspirated  F140 GA V12 found in the 812 Superfast.

Chassis 
The chassis is loosely based on the 812 and both the SP1 and SP2 cars feature carbon fibre composite bodywork. The strength of the composite bodywork allows for the inclusion of a large clamshell hood.

Performance 

Manufacturer claimed performance figures for both of the cars include a  acceleration time of 2.9 seconds,  acceleration time of 7.9 seconds and a top speed that exceeds .

Design 

The SP1 and SP2 feature low slung, carbon fibre speedster bodywork inspired by early, post-war Ferrari race cars such as the 166 MM, as well as the 250 Testarossa and 750 Monza. The SP1 is a single-seater, with the driver's position situated to one side of the car, while the SP2 has two seats separated by a center section. Both of the cars feature small scissor doors and don't have windshields, instead relying on a patented system Ferrari calls the "Virtual Windshield", which is supposed to deviate airflow away from the driver. In 2020, Ferrari Styling Centre was awarded the Compasso d’Oro industrial design award for the Monza SP1. Award was received by Flavio Manzoni and Jane Reeve. All the cars are painted at Carrozzeria Zanasi in Maranello.

References

External links 
Official website

Monza SP
Cars introduced in 2018
Retro-style automobiles
Sports cars